Fever is a novel by F. J. Thwaites.

Thwaites researched it on a trip to the Pacific Islands with his wife.

Plot
Two young men become medical researchers and go to work in Africa.

References

External links
Fever at AustLit

1939 Australian novels